

348001–348100 

|-id=034
| 348034 Deslorieux ||  || Jean-Marie Deslorieux (1871–1958), grandfather of French discoverer Jean-Claude Merlin || 
|}

348101–348200 

|-bgcolor=#f2f2f2
| colspan=4 align=center | 
|}

348201–348300 

|-id=239
| 348239 Societadante ||  || The Dante Alighieri Society (Società Dante Alighieri), a society that promotes Italian culture and language around the world. || 
|}

348301–348400 

|-id=383
| 348383 Petibon ||  || Patricia Petibon (born 1970), a French ligera coloratura soprano who studied song at the Conservatoire de Paris. First acclaimed for her interpretations of French Baroque music, she has mastered an eclectic repertoire ranging from baroque to modern music, including opera, operetta and oratorio. || 
|}

348401–348500 

|-id=407
| 348407 Patkósandrás ||  || András Patkós (born 1947), a Hungarian nuclear physicist || 
|}

348501–348600 

|-bgcolor=#f2f2f2
| colspan=4 align=center | 
|}

348601–348700 

|-bgcolor=#f2f2f2
| colspan=4 align=center | 
|}

348701–348800 

|-bgcolor=#f2f2f2
| colspan=4 align=center | 
|}

348801–348900 

|-bgcolor=#f2f2f2
| colspan=4 align=center | 
|}

348901–349000 

|-bgcolor=#f2f2f2
| colspan=4 align=center | 
|}

References 

348001-349000